Charles Oliveira da Silva (born October 17, 1989) is a Brazilian professional mixed martial artist and 3rd degree black belt Brazilian jiu-jitsu practitioner. 

Oliveira started training Brazilian jiu-jitsu in his youth, achieving multiple championship titles before transitioning to MMA in 2007. Oliveira currently competes in the Lightweight division in the Ultimate Fighting Championship (UFC), where he is a former UFC Lightweight Champion. Oliveira holds multiple UFC records, notably the most submission wins in the organization's history at 16, and most finishes at 19. As of August 22, 2022, he is #1 in the UFC lightweight rankings and as of March 7, 2023, he is #9 in the UFC men's pound-for-pound rankings.

Early life 
Oliveira was born in a poor family in the favela of Vicente de Carvalho in the tourist town Guarujá, São Paulo, Brazil. Charles started playing football, dreaming in becoming a professional player, but at age 7 he started to feel ill, he had regular pains in his body and had problems in walking, and was sometimes unable to move his legs. He was diagnosed with rheumatic fever and heart murmur, which severely affected his ankle; the medic told his family that he could become paraplegic. He was frequently bedridden, but despite all the challenges and his illnesses, Oliveira's parents insisted to put him in sports programs, and after two years he started to recover. Oliveira was introduced to Brazilian jiu-jitsu by a neighbor named Paulo, at age 12, he then  began training under Roger Coelho. Although his family had a very low income, the BJJ gym's coach offered classes for free as part of a social program. His family helped fund his training by selling street snacks and discarded cardboard. Paulo, the man who introduced Charles to jiu-jitsu, later died caught in the crossfire of a shootout in Vicente de Carvalho when Charles was 14.

Brazilian jiu-jitsu career 
Oliveira won his first Brazilian jiu-jitsu tournament in 2003 as a white belt, São Paulo State Championship in the Junior Division. In 2004 he won the São Paulo championship again, the Copa Nação Jiu-Jitsu in 2005 and in 2006  won a total of 16 medals. By 2007 he started to steer his career to focus on MMA. He was awarded his black belt in Brazilian jiu-jitsu under Ericson Cardoso and Jorge "Macaco" Patino in 2010.

Mixed martial arts career

Early career
Oliveira began his career in 2007 in his home country of Brazil, compiling a record of 12–0, with six knockouts and five submissions. On three separate occasions, Oliveira has compiled multiple wins on the same night.

His first bout was the in the amateur MMA event Circuito Nacional de Vale-Tudo Amador ("National Amateur Vale-Tudo Circuit") against Rui Machado, Oliveira submitted him with an armbar 15 seconds into the first round.

In March 2008, Oliveira made his professional debut at the Predador Fight Championship promotion, where his master Jorge Patino had previously participated at Predator FC 6. The event was the "Predator FC 9 - Welterweight Grand Prix", a one-night single-elimination tournament similar to the "Grand Prix" events held by Pride FC, where the competitors would have to fight three times in order to be crowned the champion. In the first round, Oliveira defeated Jackson Pontes via submission (rear-naked choke), which advanced him to the second stage of the tournament. Oliveira's second stage fight was against Viscardi Andrade. In the second round, Oliveira won via TKO (punches) and advanced to the final round of the tournament. Oliveira won the tournament by defeating Diego Braga via TKO (punches) in the first round of the fight.

Oliveira debuted at lightweight by defeating future UFC fighter Mehdi Baghdad in December 2008 at the first event of promotion "Kawai Arena". After that he entered into another tournament at "Korea Fight", where he defeated Daniel Fernandes and Eliene Silva via KO and TKO, respectively.

Oliveira submitted three opponents in a row over the next few months (including Bellator veteran Alexandre Bezerra), and won a split decision over Eduardo Pachu.

Oliveira once again competed twice in one night, in February 2010, defeating Rosenildo Rocha via submission (rear-naked choke) in the first round and Diego Bataglia via KO (slam).

Ultimate Fighting Championship

2010
In January 2010, Oliveira was named as the third-best Brazilian prospect to watch in 2010, according to Sherdog.

Oliveira then signed for the UFC and made his debut against Darren Elkins. This fight was originally scheduled for The Ultimate Fighter: Team Liddell vs. Team Ortiz Finale, but was rescheduled for UFC Live: Jones vs. Matyushenko due to visa issues. Oliveira defeated Elkins via submission (armbar) after 41 seconds of the first round. Oliveira was taken down early by Elkins but quickly attempted a triangle choke, before transitioning to an armbar, forcing the tap out. The submission earned him the Submission of the Night award.

Oliveira next fought against Efrain Escudero at UFC Fight Night 22 replacing an injured Matt Wiman. The bout, which served as co-main event would become a catchweight bout after Escudero weighed in at 159 lb. Oliveira went on to defeat Escudero in the third round via standing rear-naked choke. Oliveira was awarded the Submission of the Night award for his second successive UFC appearance.

Oliveira faced Jim Miller on December 11, 2010, at UFC 124. Oliveira was quickly submitted via kneebar in the first round; this marked the first loss of his career.

2011
Oliveira faced Nik Lentz on June 26, 2011, at UFC Live: Kongo vs. Barry. The fight ended in the second round after Oliveira hit Lentz with an illegal knee which went unnoticed by the referee and submitted the dazed Lentz via rear-naked choke. However, after reviewing the incident, the Pennsylvania State Athletic Commission overturned the result and declared it a no contest. The back and forth action earned both fighters Fight of the Night honors.

Oliveira was expected to face Joe Lauzon on November 19, 2011, at UFC 138. However, Oliveira instead faced Donald Cerrone on August 14, 2011, at UFC on Versus 5, replacing an injured Paul Taylor.  He lost the fight via TKO (punches) at 3:01 of the first round. His trainer stated that after going 0–2–1 NC in his last 3 fights he planned to drop down to the featherweight division.

2012
Oliveira was briefly linked to a bout with Robert Peralta on January 20, 2012, at UFC on FX: Guillard vs. Miller, but instead faced promotional newcomer Eric Wisely in a featherweight fight on January 28, 2012, at UFC on Fox: Evans vs. Davis. Oliveira won the fight via reverse calf slicer submission in the first round, marking the first time the technique had been used to finish an opponent in UFC history. Oliveira faced Jonathan Brookins on June 1, 2012, at The Ultimate Fighter 15 Finale. Oliveira used his speed to outstrike Brookins and won the fight via second round anaconda choke.

Oliveira faced Cub Swanson on September 22, 2012, at UFC 152. Early in the first round, Swanson hit Oliveira with body shots, which visibly appeared to hurt Oliveira. Swanson followed it up with an overhand right, sending Oliveira to the canvas and resulting in a KO.

2013
Oliveira faced Frankie Edgar on July 6, 2013, at UFC 162, he lost via unanimous decision. Both fighters earned Fight of the Night honors for their performance.

Oliveira was expected to face Estevan Payan on October 19, 2013, at UFC 166.  However, Payan was forced out of the bout citing a broken foot and was replaced by Jeremy Larsen.  Subsequently, on October 5, Oliveira pulled out of the Larsen bout citing a strained thigh muscle.

2014
Oliveira faced Andy Ogle on February 15, 2014, at UFC Fight Night 36. He won the fight via triangle choke submission in the third round. The win also earned him one of the first UFC Performance of the Night bonus awards.

Oliveira faced Hatsu Hioki on June 28, 2014, at UFC Fight Night 43. He won the fight via submission and became the first man to finish Hioki.

Oliveira was expected to face Nik Lentz in a rematch on September 5, 2014, at UFC Fight Night 50.  At the event weigh-in, Oliveira came in over the 146 pound featherweight limit at 150 pounds.  Subsequently, he was initially forced to surrender 20 percent of his purse to his opponent Nik Lentz and the bout was changed to a catchweight affair.  In turn, Oliveira was pulled from the event entirely on the day of the event after he fell ill from the effects of the weight cutting process.

Oliveira faced Jeremy Stephens on December 12, 2014, at The Ultimate Fighter 20 Finale. He won the fight via unanimous decision.

2015
Oliveira finally faced Nik Lentz in a rematch on May 30, 2015, at UFC Fight Night 67. Following a back and forth first two rounds, Oliveria won the fight via guillotine choke submission in the third round.  The win earned Oliveria his third Performance of the Night bonus and his third Fight of the Night bonus.

Oliveira faced Max Holloway on August 23, 2015, at UFC Fight Night 74. He lost the fight via TKO in the first round, after suffering an apparent neck/shoulder injury while attempting a takedown, and was rendered unable to continue. The injury was later described as a micro-tear in his esophagus, although Oliveira was released from a Saskatoon hospital the next day, and tested negative for major chest, neck and/or throat injuries. He later confirmed that he suffered a minor neck injury, related to a previous injury from his training camp. He did not require surgery.

Oliveira faced Myles Jury on December 19, 2015, at UFC on Fox 17. In the lead up to the fight Oliveira missed weight - his third time in his UFC career - for the bout and it was subsequently contested at a catchweight.  Oliveira won the fight via submission in the first round.

2016
Oliveira next faced Anthony Pettis on August 27, 2016, at UFC on Fox 21. After a grueling back-and-forth battle, Pettis submitted Oliveira in the third round via guillotine choke.

Oliveira faced Ricardo Lamas on November 5, 2016, at The Ultimate Fighter Latin America 3 Finale. The bout was contested at a catchweight of 155 lbs, as Oliveira missed weight by nearly 10 lbs. Lamas won the fight via submission in the second round.

2017
Oliveira faced Will Brooks in a lightweight bout on April 8, 2017, at UFC 210. He won the fight by rear-naked choke submission in the first round. He was awarded a Performance of the Night bonus.

Oliveira faced Paul Felder on December 2, 2017, at UFC 218. He lost the fight via TKO in the second round after Felder landed multiple elbows while in Oliveira's guard.

2018
In 2018 joined Chute Boxe Diego Lima in São Paulo, According to him, his former gym Macaco Gold Team (headed by Jorge "Macaco" Patino) was mostly focused BJJ with complementary striking, while he was confident with his groundfighting skills, he felt he needed to improve his striking game. Patino is still his BJJ coach but now he is complemented with Chute Boxe's trademark aggressive Muay Thai style.

Oliveira faced Clay Guida at UFC 225, replacing an injured Bobby Green. He won the fight via guillotine choke submission in the first round. The win earned him his fifth Performance of the Night bonus.

Oliveira faced returning veteran Christos Giagos on September 22, 2018, at UFC Fight Night 137. He won the fight via submission in the second round. With this win, Oliveira passed Royce Gracie for the most submission wins (11) in UFC history.  This win earned him the Performance of the Night award.

Oliveira faced Jim Miller in a rematch on December 15, 2018, at UFC on Fox 31. He won the fight via a rear-naked choke submission early in the first round.  The win earned him a seventh Performance of the Night award (setting a new record), and extended the record for most submissions in UFC History with 12.

2019
Oliveira faced David Teymur on February 2, 2019, at UFC Fight Night 144. He won the fight in the second round after stunning Teymur with an upward elbow and punches before applying an anaconda choke. With this win, Oliveira extended the UFC record for most submission wins to thirteen. This win earned him the Performance of the Night award.

As the first fight of his new, five-fight contract, a trilogy fight with Nik Lentz took place on May 18, 2019, at UFC Fight Night 152. Oliveira won the fight via TKO in the second round.

Replacing Leonardo Santos, Oliveira then faced Jared Gordon on November 16, 2019, at UFC Fight Night 164. Oliveira won the fight by knockout in the first round. This win earned him the Performance of the Night award.

2020

In January 2020 he fought a grappling superfight at the MMA event SFT 20 against Lucas Barros from Demian Maia Jiu-Jitsu. Oliveira and Barros fought with a jiu-jitsu gi in a cage under IBJJF rules. Charles won by decision.

Oliveira faced Kevin Lee on March 14, 2020, as the main event at UFC Fight Night 170. At the weigh-ins, Lee  weighed in at 158.5 lbs, 2.5 lbs over the lightweight non-title fight limit of 156 pounds. Lee was fined 20% of his purse and his bout with Oliveira was expected to proceed as scheduled at a catchweight. Oliveira won the fight via submission with a guillotine choke in the third round. This win earned him the Performance of the Night award. With this win, Oliveira also extended the UFC record for most submission wins to 14, moved to second place in terms of bonuses received with 16, and extended his finishing streak to 7, which marks the longest active finishing streak for now and ties with Donald Cerrone with most finishes in the UFC.

Oliveira was scheduled to meet Beneil Dariush on October 4, 2020 at UFC on ESPN: Holm vs. Aldana However, Oliveira pulled out of the fight in early September for undisclosed reasons.

Oliveira faced Tony Ferguson on December 12, 2020, at UFC 256 in the co-main event. After locking in a tight armbar that hyperextended Ferguson's elbow in the first round, Oliveira won the fight via unanimous decision. It was his first victory by decision since his fight against Jeremy Stephens in 2014. This win earned him his eleventh Performance of the Night award.

UFC Lightweight Champion

2021

Oliveira faced former three–time Bellator Lightweight Champion Michael Chandler for the vacant UFC Lightweight Championship, following previous champion Khabib Nurmagomedov's retirement, while headlining UFC 262 on May 15, 2021. Despite being dropped by Chandler in the first round, Oliveira won the fight via technical knockout early in the second round to claim the UFC Lightweight Championship. With the knockout win, he broke yet another record, recording the most finishes in UFC history. This win also earned Oliveira the Performance of the Night bonus award.

Oliveira made his first title defense against former UFC Interim Lightweight champion Dustin Poirier on December 11, 2021, at UFC 269. After being knocked down in the first round, Oliveira won the bout by submitting Poirier by standing rear-naked choke in the first minute of the third round. The win also earned Oliveira his twelfth Performance of the Night bonus award, a new record for the company.

2022 
Oliveira was set to make his second title defense against another former UFC Interim Lightweight Champion, Justin Gaethje, on May 7, at UFC 274. At the weigh-ins, Oliveira weighed in at 155.5 pounds, half a pound over the divisional title limit. As a result, upon commencement of the fight, Oliveira was officially stripped of the championship, and only Gaethje was eligible to win the title. This was the first time in UFC history that a title was vacated due to a weight miss. After being knocked down, Oliveira dropped Gaethje with a right hand and rallied to win the fight via rear-naked choke submission in the first round, and was declared the number one contender to the UFC Lightweight Championship. The win also earned him the third place Crypto.com "Fan Bonus of the Night" award.

The decision to strip Oliveira of the championship proved controversial in what was dubbed "scale gate", as other fighters on the UFC 274 card alleged issues with the scales. Marc Ratner, Vice President of Regulatory Affairs at the UFC, stated that the other fighters were referring to the UFC's practice scale put out the night before, not the one used by the Arizona State Athletic Commission for the official weigh-in; "Some fighters wanted to change the scale from pounds to kilograms, which you can do, and I think that may have knocked it – we don't have any proof of anything, but it may have knocked the [practice] scale out of calibration." The night before, Oliveira had stated that he was on weight using the practice scale. As a result of the allegations, UFC president Dana White stated that the UFC would hire a security guard to watch the practice scale going forward. Ariel Helwani and Dustin Poirier questioned why state athletic commissions still use balance or beam scales, which allow human error, for official weights and not more accurate digital scales. Daniel Cormier, Junior dos Santos, and Glover Teixeira criticized stripping a champion over half a pound, an amount that is acceptable for non-title fights, as excessive. In addition to citing previous UFC matches that were allowed to go ahead as championship title fights despite questionable weigh-ins, Helwani noted how state athletic commissions have no say in what happens to a championship belt and that it was entirely the UFC's decision to strip Oliveira of the title.

Oliveira faced Islam Makhachev for the vacant UFC Lightweight Championship at UFC 280 on October 22, 2022. Despite not being the champion, White stated that he "thinks" Oliveira will be receiving pay-per-view points for UFC 280. Oliveira lost the fight via arm-triangle choke submission in the second round.

2023 
Oliveira is scheduled to face Beneil Dariush on May 6, 2023, at UFC 288.

Personal life 
Oliveira and his wife have a daughter, born 2017. He resides in Guarujá, living near his old neighbourhood of Vicente de Carvalho, and helps his neighbourhood with regular charities. He is a Christian. Oliveira was previously nearsighted, and wore eyeglasses all of the time. On having to remove them to fight, he said, "If I take my glasses off, I only see 50 per cent but it never hindered me in a fight", "I see three [faces]. If I hit the middle one, that's fine". In October 2022, Oliveira said his eyes are "100 percent perfect" after having had corrective eye surgery.

In February 2023, Oliveira announced that he was joining OnlyFans in order to provide a subscription-based service to his fans, where they can see his workouts and training regime among other content.

Nickname 
His nickname "do Bronx," literally meaning "from the Bronx", as "Bronx" was a slang used for favelas and poor neighbourhoods. In an interview he revealed: "Bronx is because it's a favela, right? Outskirts, where I come from. "Do Bronx" practically came when I went to fight in a [amateur] tournament. [...] And they told me to get them a nickname, I was just Charles Oliveira. When we went to fight some jiu-jitsu championships, they always said 'look at the guys from the Bronx, from the favela'. So I put "do Bronx" in".

Instructor lineage

Brazilian Jiu-Jitsu 
Kanō Jigorō → Mitsuyo Maeda → Carlos Gracie → Hélio Gracie → Rickson Gracie → Marcelo Behring → Waldomiro Perez → Jorge Patino → Charles Oliveira

Championships and accomplishments

Brazilian jiu-jitsu 
Main Achievements (Colored Belts): 
 CBJJE South American Champion (2008 purple belt)
 CBJJE World Champion (2007 blue belt)
 FPJJ Sao Paulo State Champion (2007 blue belt)
 2nd Place CBJJE World Cup (2008 purple belt)

Mixed martial arts
 Ultimate Fighting Championship
 UFC Lightweight Championship (One time)
One successful title defense
 Fight of the Night (Three times) vs. Nik Lentz (2) and Frankie Edgar 
 Performance of the Night (Twelve times) vs. Andy Ogle, Hatsu Hioki, Nik Lentz, Will Brooks, Clay Guida, Christos Giagos, Jim Miller, David Teymur, Jared Gordon, Kevin Lee, Michael Chandler and Dustin Poirier
 Submission of the Night (Three times) 
Submission of the Year (2014) vs. Hatsu Hioki 
 Most finishes in UFC history (19)
 Most submission wins in UFC history (16)
 Most submission wins in the UFC Lightweight division history (10)
 Most submission wins in the UFC Featherweight division history (6)
 Tied (Donald Cerrone) for most Post Fight bonuses in UFC history (18)
 Most Performance of the Night awards in UFC history (12)
 Tied (Dustin Poirier, Rafael dos Anjos & Jon Jones) for fifth most wins in UFC history (21)
Tied (Joe Lauzon) for second most finishes in UFC Lightweight division history (13)
 Tied (Islam Makhachev) for third longest win streak in the UFC Lightweight division history (11)
 Second most submission attempts in UFC history (40)
 Predator FC
 Welterweight Grand Prix Champion
Cageside Press
 2021 Comeback of the Year (tied w/ Sergio Pettis) vs. Michael Chandler
Daily Mirror
2021 Fighter of the Year
 MMAJunkie.com
 2014 February Submission of the Month vs. Andy Ogle
 2015 May Submission of the Month vs. Nik Lentz
 2020 March Submission of the Month vs. Kevin Lee
2021 May Fight of the Month 
2022 May Submission of the Month 
 MMAMania.com
 2014 Submission of the Year vs. Hatsu Hioki
 Sherdog.com
 2014 Submission of the Year vs. Hatsu Hioki
 2021 Fighter of the Year
 World MMA Awards
 2021 Comeback of the Year vs. Michael Chandler at UFC 262
 2022 Submission of the Year vs. Dustin Poirier at UFC 269
 ESPY Award
 2022 Fighter of the Year
ESPN
2022 Submission of the Year

Mixed martial arts record

|-
|Loss
|align=center|33–9 (1)
|Islam Makhachev
|Submission (arm-triangle choke)
|UFC 280
|
|align=center|2
|align=center|3:16
|Abu Dhabi, United Arab Emirates
|
|-
|Win
|align=center|33–8 (1)
|Justin Gaethje
|Submission (rear-naked choke)
|UFC 274
|
|align=center|1
|align=center|3:22
|Phoenix, Arizona, United States
|
|-
|Win
|align=center|32–8 (1)
|Dustin Poirier
|Submission (rear-naked choke)
|UFC 269
|
|align=center|3
|align=center|1:02
|Las Vegas, Nevada, United States 
|
|-
|Win
|align=center|31–8 (1)
|Michael Chandler
|TKO (punches)
|UFC 262
|
|align=center|2
|align=center|0:19
|Houston, Texas, United States
|
|-
|Win
|align=center|30–8 (1)
|Tony Ferguson
|Decision (unanimous)
|UFC 256
|
|align=center|3
|align=center|5:00
|Las Vegas, Nevada, United States
|
|-
|Win
|align=center|29–8 (1)
|Kevin Lee
|Submission (guillotine choke)
|UFC Fight Night: Lee vs. Oliveira
|
|align=center|3
|align=center|0:28
|Brasília, Brazil
|
|-
|Win
|align=center|28–8 (1)
|Jared Gordon
|KO (punches)
|UFC Fight Night: Błachowicz vs. Jacaré
|
|align=center|1
|align=center|1:26
|São Paulo, Brazil
|
|-
|Win
|align=center|27–8 (1)
|Nik Lentz
|TKO (punches)
|UFC Fight Night: dos Anjos vs. Lee
|
|align=center|2
|align=center|2:11
|Rochester, New York, United States
|
|-
|Win
|align=center|26–8 (1)
|David Teymur
|Submission (anaconda choke)
|UFC Fight Night: Assunção vs. Moraes 2
|
|align=center|2
|align=center|0:55
|Fortaleza, Brazil 
|
|-
|Win
|align=center|25–8 (1)
|Jim Miller
|Submission (rear-naked choke)
|UFC on Fox: Lee vs. Iaquinta 2
|
|align=center|1
|align=center|1:15
|Milwaukee, Wisconsin, United States
|
|-
|Win
|align=center|24–8 (1)
|Christos Giagos
|Submission (rear-naked choke)
|UFC Fight Night: Santos vs. Anders
|
|align=center|2
|align=center|3:22
|São Paulo, Brazil
| 
|-
|Win
|align=center|23–8 (1)
|Clay Guida
|Submission (guillotine choke)
|UFC 225
|
|align=center|1
|align=center|2:18
|Chicago, Illinois, United States
| 
|- 
|Loss
|align=center|22–8 (1)
|Paul Felder
|TKO (elbows)
|UFC 218
|
|align=center|2
|align=center|4:06
|Detroit, Michigan, United States
|
|-
|Win
|align=center|22–7 (1)
|Will Brooks
|Submission (rear-naked choke)
|UFC 210
|
|align=center|1
|align=center|2:30
|Buffalo, New York, United States
|
|-
|Loss
|align=center|21–7 (1)
|Ricardo Lamas
|Submission (guillotine choke)
|The Ultimate Fighter Latin America 3 Finale: dos Anjos vs. Ferguson
|
|align=center|2
|align=center|2:13
|Mexico City, Mexico
|
|-
|Loss
|align=center|21–6 (1)
|Anthony Pettis
|Submission (guillotine choke)
|UFC on Fox: Maia vs. Condit
|
|align=center|3
|align=center|1:49
|Vancouver, British Columbia, Canada
|
|-
|Win
|align=center|21–5 (1)
|Myles Jury
|Submission (guillotine choke)
|UFC on Fox: dos Anjos vs. Cowboy 2
|
|align=center|1
|align=center|3:05
|Orlando, Florida, United States
|
|-
|Loss
|align=center|20–5 (1)
|Max Holloway
|TKO (esophagus injury)
|UFC Fight Night: Holloway vs. Oliveira
|
|align=center|1
|align=center|1:39
|Saskatoon, Saskatchewan, Canada
|
|-
|Win
|align=center|20–4 (1)
|Nik Lentz
|Submission (guillotine choke)
|UFC Fight Night: Condit vs. Alves
|
|align=center|3
|align=center|1:10
|Goiânia, Brazil
|
|-
|Win
|align=center|19–4 (1)
|Jeremy Stephens
|Decision (unanimous)
|The Ultimate Fighter: A Champion Will Be Crowned Finale
|
|align=center|3
|align=center|5:00
|Las Vegas, Nevada, United States
|
|-
| Win
| align=center| 18–4 (1)
| Hatsu Hioki
| Submission (anaconda choke)
| UFC Fight Night: Te Huna vs. Marquardt
| 
| align=center| 2
| align=center| 4:28
| Auckland, New Zealand
| 
|-
| Win
| align=center| 17–4 (1)
| Andy Ogle
| Submission (triangle choke)
| UFC Fight Night: Machida vs. Mousasi
| 
| align=center| 3
| align=center| 2:40
| Jaraguá do Sul, Brazil
| 
|-
| Loss
| align=center| 16–4 (1)
| Frankie Edgar
| Decision (unanimous)
| UFC 162
| 
| align=center| 3
| align=center| 5:00
| Las Vegas, Nevada, United States
| 
|-
| Loss
| align=center| 16–3 (1)
| Cub Swanson
| KO (punch)
| UFC 152
| 
| align=center| 1
| align=center| 2:40
| Toronto, Ontario, Canada
| 
|-
| Win
| align=center| 16–2 (1)
| Jonathan Brookins
| Submission (guillotine choke)
| The Ultimate Fighter: Live Finale
| 
| align=center| 2
| align=center| 2:42
| Las Vegas, Nevada, United States
|
|-
| Win
| align=center| 15–2 (1)
| Eric Wisely
| Submission (calf slicer)
| UFC on Fox: Evans vs. Davis
| 
| align=center| 1
| align=center| 1:43
| Chicago, Illinois, United States
| 
|-
| Loss
| align=center| 14–2 (1)
| Donald Cerrone
| TKO (punches)
| UFC Live: Hardy vs. Lytle
| 
| align=center| 1
| align=center| 3:01
| Milwaukee, Wisconsin, United States
|
|-
| NC
| align=center| 14–1 (1)
| Nik Lentz
| NC (illegal knee)
| UFC Live: Kongo vs. Barry
| 
| align=center| 2
| align=center| 1:48
| Pittsburgh, Pennsylvania, United States
| 
|-
| Loss
| align=center| 14–1
| Jim Miller
| Submission (kneebar)
| UFC 124
| 
| align=center| 1
| align=center| 1:59
| Montreal, Quebec, Canada
|
|-
| Win
| align=center| 14–0
| Efrain Escudero
| Submission (rear-naked choke)
| UFC Fight Night: Marquardt vs. Palhares
| 
| align=center| 3
| align=center| 2:25
| Austin, Texas, United States
| 
|-
| Win
| align=center| 13–0
| Darren Elkins
| Submission (armbar)
| UFC Live: Jones vs. Matyushenko
| 
| align=center| 1
| align=center| 0:41
| San Diego, California, United States
| 
|-
| Win
| align=center| 12–0
| Diego Battaglia
| KO (slam)
| rowspan=2|Warriors Challenge 5
| rowspan=2|
| align=center| 1
| align=center| N/A
| rowspan=2|Porto Belo, Brazil
|
|-
| Win
| align=center| 11–0
| Rosenildo Rocha
| Submission (rear-naked choke)
| align=center| 1
| align=center| 1:21
|
|-
| Win
| align=center| 10–0
| Eduardo Pachu
| Decision (split)
| Eagle Fighting Championship
| 
| align=center| 3
| align=center| 5:00
| São Paulo, Brazil
|
|-
| Win
| align=center| 9–0
| Alexandre Bezerra
| Submission (anaconda choke)
| First Class Fight 3
| 
| align=center| 2
| align=center| 1:11
| São Paulo, Brazil
|
|-
| Win
| align=center| 8–0
| Dom Stanco
| Submission (rear-naked choke)
| Ring of Combat 24
| 
| align=center| 1
| align=center| 3:33
| Atlantic City, New Jersey, United States
|
|-
| Win
| align=center| 7–0
| Carlos Soares
| Submission (triangle armbar)
| Jungle Fight 12: Warriors 2
| 
| align=center| 1
| align=center| 2:48
| Rio de Janeiro, Brazil
|
|-
| Win
| align=center| 6–0
| Elieni Silva
| TKO (knee and punches)
| rowspan=2|Korea Fight 1
| rowspan=2|
| align=center| 2
| align=center| N/A
| rowspan=2|São Paulo, Brazil
|
|-
| Win
| align=center| 5–0
| Daniel Fernandes
| KO 
| align=center| N/A
| align=center| N/A
|
|-
| Win
| align=center| 4–0
| Mehdi Baghdad
| TKO (punches)
| Kawai Arena 1
| 
| align=center| 1
| align=center| 1:01
| São Paulo, Brazil
| 
|-
| Win
| align=center| 3–0
| Diego Braga
| TKO (punches)
| rowspan=3|Predador FC 9: Welterweight Grand Prix 
| rowspan=3|
| align=center| 1
| align=center| 2:30
| rowspan=3|São Paulo, Brazil
| 
|-
| Win
| align=center| 2–0
| Viscardi Andrade
| TKO (punches)
| align=center| 2
| align=center| 2:47
| 
|-
| Win
| align=center| 1–0
| Jackson Pontes
| Submission (rear-naked choke)
| align=center| 1
| align=center| 2:11
|

Amateur mixed martial arts record 

|-
|Win
|align=center| 1–0
|Rui Machado
|Submission (armbar)
|Circuito Nacional de Vale-Tudo Amador
|
|align=center|1
|align=center|0:15
|Rio de Janeiro, Brazil
|
|-
|}

Pay-per-view bouts

See also
 List of current UFC fighters
 List of male mixed martial artists
 List of UFC records

Notes

References

External links

Living people
Brazilian expatriate sportspeople in the United States
Brazilian male mixed martial artists
Lightweight mixed martial artists
Welterweight mixed martial artists
Mixed martial artists utilizing Brazilian jiu-jitsu
Brazilian practitioners of Brazilian jiu-jitsu
People awarded a black belt in Brazilian jiu-jitsu
Sportspeople from São Paulo
1989 births
People from Guarujá
Ultimate Fighting Championship male fighters
Ultimate Fighting Championship champions
Submission-seeking fighters